The Railway Regulation Act 1840 (3 & 4 Vict c 97) is an Act of the Parliament of the United Kingdom. It brought regulation to the fast-growing railway industry in the United Kingdom.

It is one of the Railway Regulation Acts 1840 to 1893.

The Railways Department of the Board of Trade (the predecessor of His Majesty's Railway Inspectorate) was created to fulfil this task.

Provisions
Measures contained in the Act were;

No railway to be opened without notice to the Board of Trade
Returns to be made by railway companies
Appointment of Board of Trade railway inspectors
Railway byelaws to be approved by the Board
Prohibition of drunkenness by railway employees
Prohibition of obstruction of the railway
Prohibition of trespass on railways

As of 2011, Section 16 of the Act, For punishment of persons obstructing the officers of any railway company, or trespassing upon any railway remains in force, as subsequently amended. The remainder has been repealed and replaced.

References
Halsbury's Statutes,

External links
The Railway Regulation Act 1840 at railwaysarchive.co.uk
The Railway Regulation Act 1840, as amended from the National Archives.
The Railway Regulation Act 1840, as originally enacted from the National Archives.

History of rail transport in the United Kingdom
United Kingdom Acts of Parliament 1840
Railway Acts
1840 in rail transport
Transport policy in the United Kingdom